FlightPath is an open-source, web-based enterprise software application for academic support, academic advising, and degree audit for institutions of higher education. Originally created at a large public university in Louisiana, The University of Louisiana at Monroe, the software package was released as open-source software on March 13, 2013.

Mobile-friendly, Flightpath provides comprehensive and persistent academic advising to support student success in institutions of higher learning; all history of academic support can be accessed through a browser or customized cell phone application. Students receive documented guidance to take courses that progress towards graduation. Advisors and support staff can monitor progress and provide comments for advisees and campus staff. Students and advisors may also try out how accumulated course credits can lead to completion of other degrees using the "What If?" tool. Through several accreditation cycles, Flightpath has been used continuously to academically advise tens of thousands of university students since 2006.  It is actively maintained and is currently at version 6.

Background

Origins
FlightPath was created by The University of Louisiana at Monroe's Student Success Center, after searching for a commercial solution to online academic advising and retention services, but was unable to find a software package that was both affordable and customizable for specific functionality. FlightPath was operational in fall of 2006 but lacked the framework necessary for integrating contributions from the open source community. By 2012, FlightPath's core code was modified to include framework features of Drupal, a popular open-source CMS, making it suitable for adoption by other universities as an open source solution.  From its inception, FlightPath has been used as a "degree audit tool for academic advising" for tens of thousands of undergraduate students with mobile-friendly application integration.

Features
FlightPath's core open source software features provide complete solutions for academic advising including equivalent/substitution/transfer courses with degree audit. Every type of complex configuration of courses based on academic degree programs listed in a university or college catalog (prerequisite, required, and elective courses) is fully supported by catalog year with equivalent and transfer credit because design feedback modifications were requested by many dozens of academic advisors over a decade of versions; consequently, Flightpath provides easily prepared reports for accreditation needs. Automated early warning alerts for students and other related features may be integrated with Flightpath as additional modules.

Some of the core features are as follows:

 View student's transcript, degree plan, grades, progress, and more from any browser
 Perform substitutions and exceptions
 View transfer credit equivalents
 View course descriptions
 Search complete set of degree plans available by catalog year
 Appointment scheduling - Advising appointment scheduling (face-to-face or via Zoom)
 Comments/Notes - In addition to advising sessions, advisors may leave notes and comments
 At-Risk Assessment - Using basic AI, FlightPath can determine how "at-risk" a student is of falling behind or dropping out
 Complete and intuitive advising history at a glance
 Designed to support customization by administrators
 Compatible with all major browsers
 Mobile and user friendly

Add-on Modules
FlightPath's functionality is extensible through the use of add-on modules.  Below are a handful of examples:

 Banner Integration - Uses student and course data from the Banner student information system
 Locale - Translates FlightPath's static text into other languages
 SSO/LDAP - User authentication handled through an LDAP server or OAuth single-sign-on server.
 SMS text messaging - Communicate with students directly by SMS text messages (send and receive)
 Zoom meetings - Appointments may be scheduled to directly connect via Zoom on both ends.

Deployment and Installation
FlightPath is an open source enterprise software application that can be either hosted as a secure and managed cloud service or installed with freely available source code on an enterprise network application with manual setup support or with an automated installation wizard guide. Flightpath can be integrated securely in practically any campus network as a FERPA-compliant application for institutions of higher learning.  It is also available as a hosted, managed platform via FlightPath Academics.

Server Requirements
FlightPath uses industry-standard web server hardware and software:

 MySQL
 Apache
 PHP
 Linux, Unix, or Windows
 Minimum of 1GB of RAM and 10GB hard disk space

References

 Family Educational Rights and Privacy Act (FERPA)

External links
 
 Managed hosting and support - FlightPath Academics.com

Cross-platform software
Tertiary educational websites
Free educational software
Free learning support software
Free software programmed in PHP